Tatyana Azarova (born 2 December 1985 in Pavlodarskaya Oblast) is a Kazakhstani athlete who specializes in the 400 metres hurdles. Her personal best time is 54.78 seconds, achieved in May 2007 in Almaty. She competed in the 2008 Olympic Games and the 2012 Olympic Games.

Competition record

References

1985 births
Living people
People from Pavlodar Region
Kazakhstani female hurdlers
Olympic athletes of Kazakhstan
Athletes (track and field) at the 2008 Summer Olympics
Athletes (track and field) at the 2012 Summer Olympics
Asian Games medalists in athletics (track and field)
Athletes (track and field) at the 2006 Asian Games
World Athletics Championships athletes for Kazakhstan
Universiade medalists in athletics (track and field)
Asian Games silver medalists for Kazakhstan
Medalists at the 2006 Asian Games
Universiade gold medalists for Kazakhstan
Competitors at the 2005 Summer Universiade
Medalists at the 2007 Summer Universiade
21st-century Kazakhstani women